The white-toothed tuco-tuco (Ctenomys leucodon) is a species of rodent in the family Ctenomyidae. It is found in Bolivia and Peru.

References

Tuco-tucos
Mammals described in 1848
Taxonomy articles created by Polbot